John Woodruff Simpson (October 13, 1850 – May 16, 1920) was a founding member of law firm Simpson Thacher & Bartlett LLP, then titled Simpson, Thacher, & Barnum. He and his wife were known as avid art collectors, with many pieces from their estate eventually going to the National Gallery of Art in Washington, D.C.

Biography
Simpson was born and raised in East Craftsbury, Vermont.  He attended Amherst College, and graduated from Columbia Law School in 1873. He was formerly a law clerk at the old-line firm Alexander & Green. Along with his fellow former clerks Thomas Thacher and William M. Barnum, they organized their new law firm on January 1, 1884.

Simpson was one of the founding members of the "good government" organization the City Club of New York.

In the early 1900s Simpson commissioned a bronze sculpture by Moses Jacob Ezekiel in the likeness of the blind poet Homer (accompanied by a student guide), as a gift for Amherst College, his alma mater. For reasons unknown the gift was refused, and Thomas Nelson Page, a University of Virginia alumnus who was active in his college's Alumni Association, stepped in to secure the gift of the statue to UVa instead. The final sculpture, entitled Blind Homer With His Student Guide, was completed in 1907, and is currently installed on The Lawn, in the grass to the north of Old Cabell Hall.

Simpson was a presidential elector in the 1904 presidential election.

Simpson died May 16, 1920, and is buried in East Craftsbury.  He left an estate appraised in 1922 at $2,665,894 (equivalent to $ million in ).

Simpson's widow, Kate Seney Simpson, died in 1943.  Simpson never forgot his origins, and is commemorated in the John Woodruff Simpson Memorial Library in East Craftsbury.

References

External links
Simpson Thacher Firm History

1850 births
1920 deaths
Columbia Law School alumni
Amherst College alumni
New York (state) lawyers
Simpson Thacher & Bartlett
People from Craftsbury, Vermont
American art collectors
19th-century American lawyers
1904 United States presidential electors